Amer Omar Abdullah Salem Bazuhair (born 7 June 1991) is an Emirati footballer who plays as a midfielder. He was a member of Dibba Al Fujairah and the United Arab Emirates national football team.

References

External links 
Soccerway Profile
NFT Profile
Al Jazeera Profile

1991 births
Living people
Emirati footballers
Al Wahda FC players
Baniyas Club players
Sharjah FC players
Emirates Club players
Dibba FC players
UAE First Division League players
UAE Pro League players
United Arab Emirates international footballers
Association football midfielders
Place of birth missing (living people)